Bernice Irene Sumlin (November 29, 1926 – January 11, 2018) was an American educator. She became the nineteenth international president of the Alpha Kappa Alpha sorority in 1974. She was a national vice president of the National Council of Negro Women.

Early life 
Berniece Irene Sumlin was born in Dayton, Ohio, the daughter of Wright R. Sumlin and Gussie Bingham Sumlin. She graduated from Dunbar High School, and from Wilberforce College in 1948, and earned a master's degree in education administration at Miami University in 1951. She became a member of Alpha Kappa Alpha in 1946, and continued working with the sorority for the rest of her life.

Career 
Sumlin was a teacher, guidance counselor, special education coordinator, and high school principal in the Dayton Public Schools. In 1961, she helped organize the Westwood neighborhood of Dayton against a zoning variance for a storage yard. From 1970 until she retired in 1980, she was principal of an alternative high school for pregnant students. She was active in the African Methodist Episcopal Church, and served on the board of directors at Unity Bank.

After several regional and national leadership roles, Sumlin was elected the nineteenth international president of the Alpha Kappa Alpha sorority in 1974, and completed her term in 1978. She used her leadership position to focus the organization on literacy and education causes.  In 1975 Sumlin represented the sorority at International Women's Year events in Washington, D.C., and Mexico City. In 1977, she was named one of Dayton's Top Ten Women. She later received the sorority's Woman of the Decade Award.

In 1997 Sumlin gave a presentation at the Fourth African American Summit in Harare, Zimbabwe. She was also a national vice president of the National Council of Negro Women, and a fundraiser and organizer for the NAACP.

Personal life 
Sumlin died in 2018, aged 91 years, in a nursing home in Dayton.

References 

1926 births
2018 deaths
People from Dayton, Ohio
American women educators
Alpha Kappa Alpha presidents
Wilberforce University alumni
Miami University alumni
African-American educators
American educators
20th-century African-American people
21st-century African-American people
20th-century African-American women
21st-century African-American women